Kevin 'Nalts' Nalty (born May 12, 1969 in New Orleans, Louisiana) is an American Internet personality and marketer better known under his YouTube username Nalts. Nalts began on YouTube as one of the top-20 most-viewed comedy channels, and collaborates with many of today's top YouTube personalities. He has more than 1,000 videos which, as of April 18, 2016, have been viewed more than 297 million times on YouTube alone. He has been ranked as one of YouTube's Most Subscribed users.  He is the author of "Beyond Viral: How to Attract Customers, Promote Your Brand, and Make Money with Online Video (Wiley & Sons, 2010).
Nalty speaks at marketing conferences and events, and spoke about "viral video" in Boston at the 2011 International Society for Humor Studies conference in Boston. He is listed in the "Who's Who in the World of Video Marketing."

Nalty first gained notoriety for a video featured on YouTube's front page the first week of January 2007 - "Viral Video Genius - Loses His Cool When Confronted" - where he plays a skivvy-wearing, geeky intellectual passionate about viral video making. His second featured video, "Farting in Public," showed a young teenager named Spencer (Nalty's nephew's friend) using a fart machine in public places, all the while seeming to be completely oblivious to the fact that he had done so. Another of his videos, "Crackberry Blackberry", was selected as an official honoree at the 11th Annual Webby Awards.

Nalty made a video to announce his departure from his role as a Merck Product Director, and appears in many articles about memorable resignations.

He is the voice of the knife in popular web series "Annoying Orange." He has been sponsored by Fox Broadcasting, MTV, Logitech, Microsoft, Holiday Inn Express, Crowne Plaza, and Mentos.

Media appearances
Buzzfeed covered Nalty's history of pranks, and he was on 2020 podcast discussing his divorce.  
and his videos have appeared on CNN, ABC Nightline, The Today Show, Good Morning America, CBS News, Fox News and the BBC segment "Click", where one of his videos was featured on the program. He appeared as a guest judge on "Viral Video Showdown," was featured in the film "I Want My Three Minutes Back," and his videos have been featured on MTV's "Pranked." He has also appeared on a live version of the digital talk show Tom Green Live, which was broadcast at the Digital Content NewFront in June, 2009. His blog, WillVideoForFood, lists media appearances in reverse chronological order.

The Gootube Conspiracy
On December 4, 2006 Nalty started his "Gootube Conspiracy" video series where Google and YouTube (or Gootube) are trying to disintermediate major TV networks  (Fox, ABC, NBC, etc.). Nalty originally made about 32 videos of it on his channel in December, 2006. There were usually 2 video posted a day and about 1 – 2 minutes long. There have been many responses to this series from users such as cfhworld, CIAOfilms, and CQVFilms. Then he and the user Loquesto made a channel separate for the Gootube Conspiracy in January, 2007. They posted fairly often from January, 2007 - August, 2007. In Summer, 2007, Nalts quit the conspiracy and it has remained fairly active ever since, although users like CQVFilms are trying to resurrect it.

Personal
Nalty, divorced in 2020, has four adult children: Katie, Patrick, Grant, and Charlie. He lives in rural Pennsylvania with his cat Oliver. Nalty highlights the children in most of his videos. He graduated from Georgetown Preparatory High School in Rockville, Maryland, has an undergraduate degree from Georgetown, and an MBA in marketing and entrepreneurship from Babson College of Boston.

See also
 List of YouTube celebrities
 YouTube gatherings

References

External links
 Nalts' Official Blog
 Nalts' YouTube Home Page
 Nalts' MySpace Page

American Internet celebrities
Video bloggers
Living people
Jesuit High School (New Orleans) alumni
People from New Orleans
1969 births